Nikolaos "Nikos" Liakopoulos (born March 16, 1983, in Greece) is a Greek professional basketball player for KAO Korinthou of the Greek 3rd division. He is a 1.91 m (6 ft 3 in) tall point guard-shooting guard.

Professional career
Liakopoulos has played at the pro club level with some of the following clubs: Sporting, Maroussi, Irakleio, Ilysiakos, Dafni, Pagrati, Iraklis, Peramatos Ermis, Kolossos, Elefsina, AENK. In 2015, Liakopoulos signed a 2-year contract with the Greek 2nd Division club Faros Keratsiniou. In 2017, he joined the Greek 2nd Division club Doxa Lefkadas. 

In 2018, he moved to the Greek A2 League club Ionikos Nikaias, where he helped the team gain a league promotion to the highest Greek level. On July 9, 2021, he officially returned to Ionikos.

Awards and accomplishments
2× Greek Second Division: Top Scorer (2010, 2020)
Greek Third Division: Top Scorer (2011)

References

External links
FIBA Europe Profile
Eurobasket.com Profile
Greek Basket League Profile 
Draftexpress.com Profile
Basketball-Reference.com Profile

1983 births
Living people
Apollon Patras B.C. players
Dafnis B.C. players
Diagoras Dryopideon B.C. players
Doxa Lefkadas B.C. players
Faros Keratsiniou B.C. players
Greek men's basketball players
Ilysiakos B.C. players
Ionikos Nikaias B.C. players
Irakleio B.C. players
Iraklis Thessaloniki B.C. players
Kolossos Rodou B.C. players
Maroussi B.C. players
Nea Kifissia B.C. players
Pagrati B.C. players
Panelefsiniakos B.C. players
Peramatos Ermis B.C. players
Point guards
Shooting guards
Sporting basketball players
Basketball players from Athens